Strophanthus welwitschii grows as a deciduous shrub or small tree up to  tall, or as a liana up to  long, with a stem diameter up to . Its fragrant flowers feature a white turning purple corolla, creamy and red or purple-streaked on the inside. S. welwitschii is used in local medicinal treatments for respiratory conditions, gonorrhoea and scabies. The plant has been used as arrow poison. Strophanthus welwitschii is native to Democratic Republic of Congo, Tanzania, Angola and Zambia.

References

welwitschii
Plants used in traditional African medicine
Flora of the Democratic Republic of the Congo
Flora of Tanzania
Flora of Angola
Flora of Zambia
Plants described in 1888
Taxa named by Henri Ernest Baillon
Taxa named by Karl Moritz Schumann